Sahitya Akademi Translation Prizes are given each year to writers for their outstanding translations work in the 24 languages, since 1989.

Recipients  
Following is the list of recipients of Sahitya Akademi translation prizes for their works written in Gujarati. The award, as of 2019, consisted of 50,000.

See also 

 List of Sahitya Akademi Award winners for Gujarati

External links
 Akademi Translation Prizes For Gujarati Language

References

Gujarati
Indian literary awards